Robert Gray Army Airfield  is a military joint-use airport that operates alongside Killeen–Fort Hood Regional Airport. The airport is based inside the south end of the Fort Hood Military Reservation (West Fort Hood), six nautical miles (7 mi, 11 km) southwest of the central business district of Killeen, Texas, in unincorporated Bell County.

As per Federal Aviation Administration records, the airport had 232,299 passenger boardings (enplanements) in calendar year 2008, 231,500 enplanements in 2009, and 243,861 in 2010. It is included in the National Plan of Integrated Airport Systems for 2011–2015, which categorized it as a primary commercial service airport (more than 10,000 enplanements per year).

History
The base was named after a Killeen native who was a pilot of a B-25 bomber on the famous Doolittle Raid on Tokyo in 1942.  He was killed later in World War II flying combat missions.

Facilities and aircraft
The airport has one runway designated 15/33 with a PEM (Porous European Mix) surface measuring 10,000 by 200 feet (3,048 x 61 m). For the 12-month period ending April 10, 2010, the airport had 12,208 aircraft operations, an average of 33 per day: 98.5% scheduled commercial and 1.5% general aviation.

The base is also served by Hood Army Airfield  and two asphalt auxiliary landing strips used for training at North Fort Hood:

See also
 Texas World War II Army Airfields
 List of airports in Texas

References

Other sources

 Freeman, Paul (2008) Abandoned & Little-Known Airfields: Texas
 Maurer, Maurer (1983). Air Force Combat Units Of World War II. Maxwell AFB, Alabama: Office of Air Force History. .
 Ravenstein, Charles A. (1984). Air Force Combat Wings Lineage and Honors Histories 1947-1977. Maxwell AFB, Alabama: Office of Air Force History. .
 Thole, Lou (1999), Forgotten Fields of America : World War II Bases and Training, Then and Now - Vol. 2.  Publisher: Pictorial Histories Pub,

External links

 Robert Gray Army Airfield at GlobalSecurity.org
  at Texas DOT Airport Directory
 Aerial image as of February 1995 from USGS The National Map
 
 

Airports in Texas
Fort Hood
Buildings and structures in Bell County, Texas
Transportation in Bell County, Texas
Transportation in Coryell County, Texas
Airfields of the United States Army Air Forces in Texas
United States Army airfields